Chera dynasty were an Indian dynasty that ruled over parts of the present-day state of Kerala and some parts of eastern Tamil Nadu.

Chera may also refer to:

 Chera (moth), a genus of moths of the family Noctuidae
 Chera, Valencia, a municipality in Spain
 Chera Dwip, a coral reef extension off St. Martin's Island, Bangladesh
 Stanley Chera (1942–2020), American real estate developer
 Jean Chera (born 1995), Brazilian footballer
 Chera (film), a Malayalam-language film

See also
 Cheras (disambiguation)
 Cheran (disambiguation)
 Cheran, Iran (disambiguation)